Tittybong is a locality in the northwest of Victoria, Australia, within the Shires of Gannawarra and Buloke. Tittybong is located west of Kerang and east of the Calder Highway. It is south of Swan Hill, Tittybong's nearest large town. At the 2016 census, Tittybong had a population of 3.

History
The Tittybong Post Office opened on 1 January 1884 and closed in 1968.

References

Towns in Victoria (Australia)